Countdown (stylized as COUNTDOWN) is the first Korean studio album of South Korean pop duo Super Junior-D&E, a subgroup of the boy band Super Junior. The album was released on November 2, 2021.

Background

On September 27, 2021, the group announced they would be releasing their first Korean full-length album. They dropped a concept spoiler at the same day on their official Twitter account. Before the official release of the album, the members released their solo singles. The first single, California Love, the solo singles by member Donghae, was released on October 13, 2021.  A week later, Eunhyuk released his solo singles, be, on October 20, 2021.

On December 10, 2021, the group released an epilogue version of the album, with an additional new track, Need U. Both members involved in lyrics writing of the track.

Track listing

References

External links

2021 albums
Super Junior albums
SM Entertainment albums
Korean-language albums